The cave of Valporquero (la cueva de Valporquero" is located at the north of the Province of León (Spain), near the village of Valporquero de Torío in the municipality of Vegacervera and  47 km away from the capital city, León. Open to the tourism since 1966, the management is done by the Diputación de León.

The "open route" to the normal tourism is 1300 m long through six "halls" with increasing complexity and diversity of the geological formations, from the small marvels hall to the marvel hall.

The "bottom level is 3150 m long" including a subterranean river.

The main six halls are:
 Pequeñas maravillas (small marvels hall)
 Gran Rotonda
 Hadas
 Cementerio estalactítico
 Gran vía
 Maravillas (marvel hall)

See also
 Province of León
 Montes de León

References

External links
 The Official Tourism Website of the Province of Leon
 Leonese Provincial Government

Valporquero
Geography of the Province of León
Tourist attractions in Castile and León
Caves of Spain